Harmsiopanax ingens of the Gensing, or Ivy Family (Araliaceae), is a very spiney  palmlike mesocaul tree endemic to the montane rainforests of central New Guinea which bears a terminal rosette of deeply lobed, meter-wide (3.25-foot wide) dentate margined, peltate leaves on equally long petioles.  It ultimately attains a height of eighteen meters (59 feet), at which point it bears a huge panicle of flowers five meters (16.5 feet) high and equally wide; the largest above ground inflorescence of any dicot plant (although Caloncoba flagelliflora (Achariaceae; of West Africa) and Ficus geocarpa (Moraceae; of the Malay Peninsula) and Ficus unciata var. strigosa (also of Malaya) have larger subsurface panicles, each about nine meters (thirty feet) in length.  H. ingens' panicles are very unusual; the ultimate twigs being spikes each bearing about fifty tiny umbels, each umbel with 8 to 20 minute flowers. So panicle, spike and umbel are all represented in a single inflorescence. Harmsiopanax ingens is monocarpic, and again the largest such plant among dicots. H. ingens was discovered in 1973 by  W. R. Philipson. Its native name is "makua".

References

Araliaceae